Anton Johnson Fridrichsen (4 January 1888 – 16 November 1953) was a Norwegian-born Swedish theologian.

Biography
He was born at Meråker   in Trøndelag, Norway.
He became cand. theol. in 1911 and then studied ancient Christian theology and classical philology at the University of Breslau and the University of Göttingen. In 1925 he received his theological doctorate from the University of Strasbourg. He was appointed professor of exegesis at the Uppsala University from 1928. Among his works are Hagios-Qadoš from 1916, and his thesis from 1925  Le Problème du miracle dans le christianisme primitif .

References

1888 births
1953 deaths
People from Meråker
People educated at the Trondheim Cathedral School
Norwegian theologians
Swedish theologians
University of Strasbourg alumni
Academic staff of Uppsala University
Norwegian emigrants to Sweden
Naturalized citizens of Sweden
Burials at Uppsala old cemetery
20th-century Lutherans